Tân Mỹ is a commune (xã) and village of Bắc Giang city, Bắc Giang Province in the Northeast region of Vietnam.

References

Populated places in Bắc Giang province
Communes of Bắc Giang province